Pinkney "Pink" Anderson (February 12, 1900 – October 12, 1974) was an American blues singer and guitarist.

Life and career
Anderson was born in Laurens, South Carolina, and raised in nearby Greenville and Spartanburg. He joined Dr. William R. Kerr of the Indian Remedy Company in 1914 to entertain the crowds, while Kerr tried to sell a concoction purported to have medicinal qualities.  During this time Anderson occasionally worked with Blind Simmie Dooley in the Spartanburg area, recording with him in 1928 for the Columbia label. In the 1950s Anderson toured with Leo "Chief Thundercloud" Kahdot and his medicine show, often with the harmonica player Arthur "Peg Leg Sam" Jackson, who was based in Jonesville, South Carolina.

Anderson was recorded by the folklorist Paul Clayton at the Virginia State Fair in May 1950.
He recorded an album in the early 1960s and performed at some live venues. He appeared in the 1963 film The Bluesmen. He reduced his activities in the late 1960s after a stroke. Attempts by the folklorist Peter B. Lowry to record Anderson in 1970 were not successful, although apparently he could occasionally summon up some of his past abilities. A final tour took place in the early 1970s with the aid of Roy Book Binder, one of his students, taking him to Boston and New York City.

He died in October 1974 of a heart attack, at the age of 74. He is interred at Lincoln Memorial Gardens, in Spartanburg.

Anderson's son, known as Little Pink Anderson (born July 13, 1954), is a bluesman living in Vermillion, South Dakota.

The Pink in Pink Floyd
Syd Barrett, of English progressive rock band Pink Floyd, created the band's name by juxtaposing the first names of Anderson and North Carolina bluesman Floyd Council.

Discography

Singles
"Papa's About to Get Mad" / "Gonna Tip Out Tonight", Pink Anderson and Simmie Dooley (recorded April 14, 1928), Columbia 14336-D
"Every Day in the Week Blues" / "C.C. and O. Blues", Pink Anderson and Simmie Dooley (recorded April 14, 1928), Columbia 14400-D

Albums
American Street Songs (Riverside, 1956) – shared album with Reverend Gary Davis
Carolina Blues Man (Bluesville, 1961)
Medicine Show Man (Bluesville, 1962)
Ballad & Folksinger (Bluesville, 1963)
Carolina Medicine Show Hokum & Blues (Folkways, 1961–62 [1984])

See also
List of blues musicians
List of country blues musicians
List of people from South Carolina
List of Piedmont blues musicians

References

External links

 Grave marker
 Illustrated Pink Anderson Discography
 Introducing Pink Anderson

1900 births
1974 deaths
20th-century African-American male singers
African-American guitarists
American blues guitarists
American male guitarists
American blues singers
Columbia Records artists
Country blues musicians
Singers from South Carolina
People from Laurens, South Carolina
Piedmont blues musicians
20th-century American guitarists
Guitarists from South Carolina